Tsao Chih-I (born October 6, 1997) is a Taiwanese figure skater. He is a six-time national champion of Taiwan. He has qualified to the final segment at five World Junior Championships and five Four Continents Championships.

Programs

Competitive highlights
CS: Challenger Series; JGP: Junior Grand Prix

References

External links

 

1997 births
Living people
Sportspeople from Taipei
Taiwanese male single skaters
Figure skaters at the 2017 Asian Winter Games
Asian Games competitors for Chinese Taipei
Competitors at the 2017 Winter Universiade